Castillo Formation can refer to:
 Castillo Formation, Venezuela, an Early Miocene geologic formation in Venezuela
 Castillo Formation, Argentina, a Cenomanian geologic formation in Argentina
 Castillo Pedroso Formation, a Jurassic geologic formation in Spain
 Cerro Castillo Formation, a Jurassic geologic formation in Argentina
 Sierra del Castillo Formation, a Carboniferous geologic formation in Spain